Michaela Kardeis (born 5 March 1972) was the Director General for the Public Security in the Austrian Ministry of the Interior. Previously she served as police vice-president at the state police directorate Vienna.

References 

Living people
Women government ministers of Austria
1972 births